Cliniodes opertalis is a moth in the family Crambidae. It was described by James E. Hayden in 2011. It is found at low elevations in Peru, southern Venezuela and Brazil (Rondônia).

The length of the forewings is 12–15 mm. The forewing costa and basal area are brownish grey, sometimes with dark red scales. The medial area is greyish brown and the postmedial and terminal areas are brown or reddish brown. The hindwings are translucent white with a black marginal band. Adults have been recorded on wing in May, August and November.

Etymology
The species name refers to the similarity to Cliniodes opalalis and is derived from Latin opertus (meaning hidden).

References

Moths described in 2011
Eurrhypini